The 2019–20 UEFA Europa League group stage began on 19 September and ended on 12 December 2019. A total of 48 teams competed in the group stage to decide 24 of the 32 places in the knockout phase of the 2019–20 UEFA Europa League.

Draw
The draw for the group stage was held on 30 August 2019, 13:00 CEST, at the Grimaldi Forum in Monaco.

The 48 teams were drawn into twelve groups of four, with the restriction that teams from the same association could not be drawn against each other. For the draw, the teams were seeded into four pots based on their 2019 UEFA club coefficients.

On 17 July 2014, the UEFA emergency panel ruled that Ukrainian and Russian clubs would not be drawn against each other "until further notice" due to the political unrest between the countries.

Moreover, for associations with two or more teams, teams were paired in order to split them into two sets of six groups (A–F, G–L) for maximum television coverage. The following pairings were announced by UEFA after the group stage teams were confirmed:

Spain: Sevilla and Espanyol
England: Arsenal and Manchester United
Italy: Roma and Lazio
Germany: Borussia Mönchengladbach and Eintracht Frankfurt
France: Saint-Étienne and Rennes
Russia: CSKA Moscow and Krasnodar
Portugal: Porto and Sporting CP; Braga and Vitória de Guimarães
Ukraine: Dynamo Kyiv and Oleksandriya
Belgium: KAA Gent and Standard Liège
Turkey: Beşiktaş and Trabzonspor
Netherlands: PSV Eindhoven and Feyenoord
Austria: LASK and Wolfsberger AC
Switzerland: Basel and Young Boys
Scotland: Celtic and Rangers

On each matchday, one set of six groups play their matches at 18:55 CET/CEST, while the other set of six groups play their matches at 21:00 CET/CEST, with the two sets of groups alternating between each matchday. The fixtures were decided after the draw, using a computer draw not shown to public, with the following match sequence (Regulations Article 15.02):

Note: Positions for scheduling do not use the seeding pots, e.g. Team 1 is not necessarily the team from Pot 1 in the draw.

There were scheduling restrictions: for example, teams from the same city (e.g. Lazio and Roma) in general were not scheduled to play at home on the same matchday (to avoid them playing at home on the same day, due to logistics and crowd control), and teams from "winter countries" (e.g. Russia) were not scheduled to play at home on the last matchday (due to cold weather).

Teams
Below were the participating teams (with their 2019 UEFA club coefficients), grouped by their seeding pot. They included:
17 teams which entered in the group stage
21 winners of the play-off round (8 from Champions Path, 13 from Main Path)
6 losers of the Champions League play-off round (4 from Champions Path, 2 from League Path)
4 League Path losers of the Champions League third qualifying round

Notes

Format
In each group, teams played against each other home-and-away in a round-robin format. The group winners and runners-up advanced to the round of 32, where they were joined by the eight third-placed teams of the Champions League group stage.

Tiebreakers
Teams were ranked according to points (3 points for a win, 1 point for a draw, 0 points for a loss), and if tied on points, the following tiebreaking criteria were applied, in the order given, to determine the rankings (Regulations Articles 16.01):
Points in head-to-head matches among tied teams;
Goal difference in head-to-head matches among tied teams;
Goals scored in head-to-head matches among tied teams;
Away goals scored in head-to-head matches among tied teams;
If more than two teams were tied, and after applying all head-to-head criteria above, a subset of teams were still tied, all head-to-head criteria above were reapplied exclusively to this subset of teams;
Goal difference in all group matches;
Goals scored in all group matches;
Away goals scored in all group matches;
Wins in all group matches;
Away wins in all group matches;
Disciplinary points (red card = 3 points, yellow card = 1 point, expulsion for two yellow cards in one match = 3 points);
UEFA club coefficient.

Groups
The matchdays were 19 September, 3 October, 24 October, 7 November, 28 November, and 12 December 2019. The scheduled kickoff times were 18:55 and 21:00 CET/CEST, with possible exceptions at 16:50 CET/CEST due to geographical reasons.

Times are CET/CEST, as listed by UEFA (local times, if different, are in parentheses).

Group A

Group B

Group C

Group D

Group E

Group F

Group G

Group H

Group I

Group J

Group K

Group L

Notes

References

External links

2
2019-20
September 2019 sports events in Europe
October 2019 sports events in Europe
November 2019 sports events in Europe
December 2019 sports events in Europe